Scorpaenopsis orientalis is a species of venomous marine ray-finned fish belonging to the family Scorpaenidae, the scorpionfishes. This species is found in the Northwest Pacific around Japan.

Size

References

orientalis
Taxa named by John Ernest Randall
Taxa named by William N. Eschmeyer
Fish described in 2002